Bruno A. Ramos Olivera (born December 4, 1950 in Adjuntas, Puerto Rico) is a Puerto Rican politician and former senator. He was a member of the Senate of Puerto Rico from 1997 to 2005 representing the Popular Democratic Party (PPD).

Early years and studies

Bruno Ramos was born on December 4, 1950, in Adjuntas, Puerto Rico. He finished his elementary and high school in Utuado. Ramos then received a bachelor's degree in education with a major in mathematics from the Pontifical Catholic University of Puerto Rico. He then completed a master's degree in education from the same college.

Professional career

Ramos has worked at several positions in the public education system of Puerto Rico. He served as Title I supervisor, and as a teacher in elementary, junior high, and high school. He also worked as a school director. He has also worked as a professor for the Universidad del Este in Utuado.

Political career

Ramos began his political career as president of the Municipal Assembly of Utuado during the 1992–1996 term. He was elected to the Senate of Puerto Rico for the first time in 1996 general elections, representing the District of Ponce, along with Modesto Agosto Alicea. They were both reelected in 2000.

Agosto and Ramos were reelected again in the 2004 general elections. During that term, Ramos served as speaker of his party on several commissions.

Agosto and Ramos lost their place in the PPD ballot after losing at the 2008 PPD primaries.

References

External links
 on SenadoPR

1950 births
Living people
People from Adjuntas, Puerto Rico
Members of the Senate of Puerto Rico
Popular Democratic Party (Puerto Rico) politicians